Joseph Vincent Camilleri, (born 21 May 1948) aka Jo Jo Zep or Joey Vincent, is a Maltese Australian singer-songwriter and musician. Camilleri has recorded as a solo artist and as a member of Jo Jo Zep & The Falcons and The Black Sorrows. Jo Jo Zep & The Falcons' highest-charting single was "Hit & Run" from June 1979, which peaked at #12; Jo Jo Zep's "Taxi Mary" peaked at No. 11 in September 1982; and The Black Sorrows top single, "Chained to the Wheel", peaked at No. 9 in March 1989.

Camilleri has also produced records for The Sports, Jo Jo Zep & The Falcons, Paul Kelly & the Dots, The Black Sorrows, Renée Geyer, and Ross Wilson. Australian music journalist, Ian McFarlane, described him as "one of the most genuinely talented figures in Australian music", and, as a member of Jo Jo Zep & The Falcons, Camilleri was inducted into the Australian Recording Industry Association (ARIA) Hall of Fame in 2007.

The Black Sorrows' Saint Georges Road (2021) represented Camilleri's 50th career release.

Biography

Early years
Joe Camilleri was born the third of ten children in Malta in 1948. The family migrated to Australia when he was two. Camilleri grew up in Port Melbourne and listened to rock music on the radio. His mother called him Zep and he became known as Jo Zep. Camilleri began his music career in 1964 when literally thrown onstage to sing with The Drollies. He played blues and R&B in the mid-1960s with The King Bees, and was then a member of Adderley Smith Blues Band. In 1968, lead singer for the band, Broderick Smith had been conscripted for National Service during the Vietnam War. Camilleri lasted a year with Adderley Smith, and enjoyed working with the band including guitarist Kerryn Tolhurst (later in The Dingoes with Smith). According to Australian music journalist Ed Nimmervoll, Camilleri was sacked for sounding too much like Mick Jagger and upstaging other band members. After Adderley Smith, Camilleri was a member of various bands, including The Pelaco Brothers during 1974–1975.

Jo Jo Zep & The Falcons: 1975–1983, 2001–2003, 2011–present

Jo Jo Zep & The Falcons formed in 1975 and Camilleri gained national prominence as the group's lead singer, co-songwriter and saxophonist. Other members (from 1976 on) included Jeff Burstin (guitar, vocals), John Power (bass guitar, vocals), Gary Young (drums), Tony Faehse (guitar, vocals) and Wilbur Wilde on sax. Incorporating influences from blues, R&B, soul, punk rock, new wave and reggae, the group achieved considerable commercial and critical success in Australia. Hit singles for Jo Jo Zep & The Falcons included "Shape I'm In" and "Puppet on a String"; their highest-charting single was "Hit & Run" from June 1979 which peaked at No. 12.

In 1981, most of The Falcons left the group, and the act's name was shortened to Jo Jo Zep. "Taxi Mary", credited to Jo Jo Zep, peaked at No. 11 in September 1982. The Jo Jo Zep ensemble became unwieldy with, at its peak, a roster of 11 members and disbanded in 1983.

The classic 1976–1981 group reformed in 2001 for a one-off gig, but stayed together to release an album of new material, Ricochet, in 2003. As a member of Jo Jo Zep & The Falcons, Camilleri was inducted into the Australian Recording Industry Association (ARIA) Hall of Fame in 2007. The group continues to tour and play live dates.

The Black Sorrows: 1984–current

After the demise of Jo Jo Zep & the Falcons in 1983, Camilleri achieved his greatest success with another long-running group The Black Sorrows, which began in 1984 as an informal semi-acoustic band playing blues, R&B and zydeco. The Black Sorrows had a shifting line-up and at various points included three ex-Falcons: Jeff Burstin, Wayne Burt, and Gary Young. Later additions to the band included sisters Vika and Linda Bull on vocals, and backing vocalist and lyricist Nick Smith.  Camilleri himself has been the only constant member of the group.

The Black Sorrows developed a strong fan following and garnered wide critical acclaim for their recordings and superb live performances. After starting life as an acoustic cover band, they evolved into a full electric ensemble that wrote their own material, releasing a string of commercially successful and critically acclaimed albums in the 1980s and 1990s.  These albums included A Place in the World, Dear Children (an Australian Top 20 album in 1987), Hold On to Me (peaked at No. 7, 1988), Harley & Rose (peaked at No. 3, 1990), Better Times (peaked at No. 13, 1992) and compilation The Chosen Ones – Greatest Hits (peaked at No. 4, 1993). Top 30 hit singles by the band were "Chained to the Wheel" (which peaked at No. 9 in 1989), "Harley + Rose" (1990) "Never Let Me Go" (1990), and "Snake Skin Shoes" (1994).

For the first several years the band was in existence, Camilleri performed under the pseudonym "Joey Vincent" (a name he had previously used for a solo single), although he wrote and produced material for the group using his real name.  The "Joey Vincent" persona was finally dropped in time for the release of 1990's Harley & Rose.

With a number of different line-ups, the band has continued to release material through the 1990s and 2000s.

Other projects

The Revelators: 1989–2012

While with The Black Sorrows, Camilleri also performed with The Revelators. The Revelators returned to the Black Sorrows roots of playing mostly covers of country/R&B style music, and had virtually the same line-up as The Black Sorrows. They released their first album in 1991 called Amazing Stories and followed it up with two others, The Adventures of The Amazing Revelators (2000) and The Revelators (2002). The Revelators were active as a live group from circa 1989 through about 2012.

Bakelite Radio : 2000–2007, 2020
Bakelite Radio was another side project from the early 2000s.  This particular group focussed on more acoustically-oriented music, though still in a country/R&B mould. The repertoire consisted mostly (but not exclusively) of cover songs, and the line-up—as is characteristic of Camilleri's bands—was fairly fluid.

The group released four albums between 2003 and 2009: in order of release, they were Bakelite Radio Volume II (2003), Bakelite Radio Volume III (2004) Bakelite Radio Volume IV (2007), and Bakelite Radio Volume I (2009). As a live act, Bakelite Radio was active from 2001 to 2007.

After a long hiatus, the group (with a largely modified line-up, save Camilleri) returned in 2020, issuing their fifth album Rosary of Tears as a combined vinyl and CD package.

The Voodoo Sheiks: 2011–present 
The Voodoo Sheiks are a ten-piece ensemble led by Camilleri and John McAll that celebrates the musical heritage of New Orleans.  The band features a large brass section, and a repertoire of cover songs. They started playing gigs circa 2011, and for a time supplanted Camilleri's previous side projects The Revelators and Bakelite Radio. The Voodoo Sheiks have yet to record under their own name, although one track on The Black Sorrows' 2014 album Certified Blue is called "The Return Of The Voodoo Sheiks" and was played by the then-current Voodoo Sheiks line-up. The Voodoo Sheiks horns include Julien Wilson, Tim Wilson, Greg Clarkson on saxophone, James Mustafa and Travis Woods on trumpet and Ben Gillespie on trombone.

Here Comes The Night: 2013–present 
Here Comes The Night is a Van Morrison tribute project, spearheaded by Camilleri in association with Vince Jones and Vika Bull.  Beginning in 2013, the group has performed several live shows throughout Australia.

Production and session work
Beginning in the late 1970s, Camilleri also produced recordings for other artists including The Sports, Paul Kelly & the Dots, Renée Geyer, and Ross Wilson. He can also be heard as a session musician and/or vocalist on recordings by numerous Australian recording acts, including Skyhooks, Tim Finn, Icehouse, and Mondo Rock.

Solo releases
Camilleri has only infrequently released material with solo billing. A 1980 single credited to "Joey Vincent" was his first solo project; two additional singles from the 1980s and a 1995 maxi single called "All Saint's Hotel" are his only other solo releases of original material.

Studio albums

Compilation albums

Singles

Chronological list of albums
The Black Sorrows' Saint Georges Road (2021) represented Camilleri's 50th career release.

 The Notorious Pelaco Brothers Show (aka The Pelaco Bros.) (1976)
 Don't Waste It (1977)
 Whip It Out (1977)
 Live!! Loud and Clear (1978)
 So Young (1978)
 Let's Drip Awhile (1979)
 Screaming Targets (1979)
 Hats Off Step Lively (1980)
 Dexterity (1981)
 Cha (as Jo Jo Zep) (1982)
 The Sound of Jo Jo Zep & The Falcons (1983)
 Sonola (1984)
 Rockin' Zydeco (1985)
 A Place in the World (1985)
 Dear Children (1987)
 Hold on to Me (1988)
 Harley and Rose (1990)
 Amazing Stories (1991)
 Better Times (1992)
 The Chosen Ones – Greatest Hits (1993)
 Lucky Charm (1994)
 Radio Waves (1996)
 Shape I'm In: The Complete Anthology (1997)
 The Very Best of The Black Sorrows (1997)
 Beat Club (1998) 
 The Adventures of The Amazing Revelators (2000) 
 The Revelators (2002)
 Ricochet (2003)
 Bakelite Radio Volume II (2003)
 I Believe to My Soul - The Best of 1977-2003 (2004)
 The Great Black Sorrows (2004)
 Bakelite Radio Volume III (2004)
 One Mo' Time (2004)
 Limestone (2005)
 Roarin' Town (2006)
 Bakelite Radio Volume IV (2007)
 The Best of Jo Jo Zep & The Falcons (2007)
 The Essential Black Sorrows (2007)
 Bakelite Radio Volume I (2009)
 45 Years (2009)
 4 Days in Sing Sing (2009)
 Crooked Little Thoughts (2012)
 The Best Of... The Revelators (2012)
 Time of My Life (2013)
 Certified Blue (2014)
 Endless Sleep Chapter 46 (2015)
 Endless Sleep Chapter 47 (2015)
 Faithful Satellite (2016)
 Citizen John (2019)
 Saint Georges Road (2021)

Awards and nominations

ARIA Music Awards
The ARIA Music Awards is an annual awards ceremony that recognises excellence, innovation, and achievement across all genres of Australian music. They commenced in 1987. Joe Camilleri was inducted into the Hall of Fame in 2007 as part of Jo Jo Zep.

|-
| 2007
| Joe Camilleri (as part of Jo Jo Zep)
| ARIA Hall of Fame
|

Mo Awards
The Australian Entertainment Mo Awards (commonly known informally as the Mo Awards), were annual Australian entertainment industry awards. They recognise achievements in live entertainment in Australia from 1975 to 2016. Joe Camilleri  won one award in that time.
 (wins only)
|-
| 1990
| Joe Camilleri 
| Rock Performer of the Year
| 
|-

Music Victoria Awards
The Music Victoria Awards are an annual awards night celebrating Victorian music. They commenced in 2006.

! 
|-
| Music Victoria Awards of 2020
| Rosary of Tears (as Joey Vincent's Bakelite Radio)
| Best Blues Album
| 
| 
|-

References

External links

Joe Camilleri at Australian Rock Database by Magnus Holmgren

1948 births
Living people
Australian people of Maltese descent
Australian saxophonists
Male saxophonists
Australian singer-songwriters
Musicians from Melbourne
Maltese emigrants to Australia
Australian guitarists
Australian session musicians
Australian record producers
Jo Jo Zep & The Falcons members
21st-century saxophonists
21st-century Australian male musicians
21st-century Australian musicians
Australian male guitarists
Australian male singer-songwriters